William Crolly (8 June 1780 – 8 April 1849) was the Bishop of Down and Connor from 1825 to 1835, and the Roman Catholic Archbishop of Armagh from 1835 to 1849.

Early life and education

A native of Ballykilbeg near Downpatrick, Crolly was born on 8 June 1780 and like his successors as Bishop of Down and Connor, Cornelius Denvir and Patrick Dorrian, was educated at Mr. Nelson's Classical school in Downpatrick.  At the age of 18 he witnessed the upheaval and aftermath of the 1798 United Irishmen rising at the county jail in Downpatrick, where it is believed that one of the assistant schoolmasters was imprisoned.

Crolly went to Maynooth College where he excelled as a student, obtaining a first in Dogmatic Theology in 1806, the same year he was ordained a priest by Archbishop Troy.

Crolly was in demand as a lecturer at Maynooth and spent several years on the academic staff, but in 1812 moved to St Patrick's Church, Belfast. He preached at the opening of the original church on 5 March 1815 in a ceremony presided over by Bishop Patrick MacMullan whom he would eventually succeed.

Bishop of Down and Connor

In 1825 Crolly was appointed Bishop of Down and Connor and received episcopal ordination in St. Patrick's Church, Donegall St, the first time a Catholic Bishop had ever been ordained in Belfast.  

Dr Crolly spent a decade ministering in his native diocese and among the most important and enduring aspects of his episcopate was the establishment of St. Malachy's College in 1833, although he also oversaw the construction of many churches in rural parishes.  

One writer estimates this was only possible by Crolly living with his curates in a single house in Belfast.

Archbishop of Armagh

In 1835 Crolly was appointed Archbishop of Armagh in succession to Thomas Kelly who has served under three years in office. He began the construction of the Cathedral in Armagh and laid the foundation stone on St Patrick's Day, 1840. He appointed Thomas Duff architect and also decreed that work be suspended because of the Great Irish Famine.

His support for non-denominational education and his cautious welcome of the Queen's College's in 1845, a position at variance with most other Irish bishops of the time, led to him being remembered at his death as a "thoroughly tolerant man ... who devoted himself heart and soul to the advancement of his church".

He died of cholera in Drogheda, Co. Louth, in April 1849. An obituary notice in The Spectator noting the suddenness of his death recorded that 'his amiable qualities, his charitable bearing, and his moderate and conciliatory political course, secured him universal esteem, and will cause his death to be universally mourned in Ireland.'

His birthplace in Ballykilbeg, Co. Down, is remembered on a blue plaque.

References

Sources

1780 births
1849 deaths
Deaths from cholera
People from Downpatrick
19th-century Irish Roman Catholic theologians
Roman Catholic archbishops of Armagh
19th-century Roman Catholic archbishops in Ireland
Alumni of St Patrick's College, Maynooth
Roman Catholic bishops of Down and Connor